Ruf Automobile GmbH (stylized as RUF) is a German car manufacturer. Formerly using Porsche bodies in white to build cars, today they build vehicles on their own bodies and chassis.  They also manufacture performance parts for various Porsche models, including the 911, Boxster, and Cayman.

The company rose to fame when in 1987, its Porsche-derived CTR reached 211 mph, surpassing the Ferrari F40's previous top speed record of 201 mph.  In 2017, Ruf unveiled a modern revival of the classic CTR "Yellow Bird" with a claimed top speed of 225 mph.

History 
The company was founded in 1939 in Pfaffenhausen, Germany as "Auto Ruf" by Alois Ruf Sr. as a service garage and was eventually expanded to include a full-service gas station in 1949. Ruf began experimenting with vehicle designs of his own in the late 1940s, and in 1955 designed and built a tour bus, which he marketed around Germany. The positive response it received led to Ruf expanding his business again by starting his own separately owned bus company.

Alois Sr.'s involvement in the car industry had a distinct effect on his son, Alois Ruf Jr., who became a sports car enthusiast. In 1960, Alois Jr. began servicing and restoring Porsche automobiles out of his father's garage. Following Alois Sr's. death in 1974, 24-year-old Alois Jr. took control of the business and focused on his passion: Porsche vehicles, and especially the 911. A year later in 1975, the first Ruf-enhanced Porsche came to life.

Ruf debuted their first complete model in 1977, a tuned version of Porsche's 930 with a stroked 3.3 litre motor. This was followed in 1978 by Ruf's first complete non-turbo Porsche, the 911 SCR. It was a naturally aspirated 911 with a stroked 3.2 litre motor producing 217 horsepower. Numerous customer orders were placed for this vehicle.

However, the CTR2 cost only a fraction of the price of the F1.

In April 2007, Ruf released the new CTR3 to celebrate the company's new plant in Bahrain, and as a 20th anniversary celebration of the original CTR and successor to the CTR2. The Ruf CTR3 was designed and engineered in a partnership with the Canadian engineering firm Multimatic.  The Ruf CTR3 was Ruf's first entirely unique model, built using their own chassis and body.  The CTR3 differs from typical Ruf models in that it uses a Mid-engine design, as opposed to the 911's Rear-engine design.  Automotive journalists have compared it to the Porsche 911 GT1, which similarly used a mid-engine layout with a body designed to resemble the Porsche 911.

In 2017, Ruf unveiled the Ruf CTR Anniversary at the Geneva Motor Show, 30 years after the launch of the original Ruf CTR.  The CTR Anniversary is Ruf's second model to use their own body and chassis design, which was designed and engineered in partnership with German engineering firm Vela Performance.  The Ruf CTR Anniversary retains the Porsche 911's rear-engine layout, but does not use any major Porsche components.  The only original Porsche parts are windows and windscreen wipers borrowed from the 964 and 993.  The CTR Anniversary uses a 3.6-litre water cooled twin-turbocharged flat-6 engine producing , and a custom 7-speed transmission built to Ruf's specification by ZF., and is unrelated to any Porsche transmissions.

In 2018, Ruf unveiled the new Ruf SCR.  The SCR uses the same in-house body and chassis design from the Ruf CTR Anniversary, although with a normally aspirated engine producing 510 PS (503 hp; 375 kW).  The 2018 Ruf SCR borrows its name from the 1978 Ruf SCR.

Ruf models

Current models
CTR3 Clubsport
CTR Anniversary
SCR 2018

Past models

eRuf electric vehicles 

The eRuf Model A is an all-electric sports car made by Ruf Automobile. The car is powered by a UQM Technologies propulsion system (a UQM PowerPhase 150). The power and torque produced by the 3-phase motor can be used to recover almost as much power as it can put out. During coasting the engine works as a generator producing electricity to charge the batteries. Ruf announced that it hoped to begin production of the eRuf in the autumn of 2009. This did not happen, and at the 2009 Geneva Motor Show, Ruf announced a new model, the eRUF Greenster, with limited production planned to commence at the end of 2010.

In video games 
Ruf models have historically appeared in many large racing video game franchises as a substitute for the Porsche models they are based on due to Porsche's exclusive licensing in video games. Starting with the release of Need for Speed: Porsche Unleashed in 2000, Porsche entered an exclusivity deal with Electronic Arts (EA) which meant that Porsche models would only appear in EA's titles, most notably the Need for Speed franchise and the Real Racing series. The only exceptions to this were a number of games in the Forza and Project Gotham Racing series due to sub licensing arrangements made between EA and their games' respective developers, Turn 10 Studios and Bizarre Creations. Other large video game franchises, however, including Gran Turismo, Project CARS, Assetto Corsa, Asphalt, Test Drive, The Crew, Driver: San Francisco, Driveclub and a few Forza games used Ruf models in place of Porsche. This circumvented Porsche's licensing as Ruf is considered by the German government to be a full fledged manufacturer, and as such Ruf models have unique VINs. The exclusivity deal between Porsche and EA ended in 2016, leading many franchises to stop featuring Ruf models in favor of Porsche. Though it has never been publicly confirmed, it has been speculated that Porsche and RUF can no longer co-exist in games due to interference from Porsche. For instance, in Asphalt 8: Airborne, RUFs and all other vehicles resembling Porsches were removed in a Porsche-themed update. The Crew 2 features both brands, but neither competes against each other due to the game's car classification system. However, Gran Turismo Sport, Gran Turismo 7, Gear.Club Unlimited 2, and Nitro Nation feature both brands that can compete against each other at any time.

References

External links 

 

Car manufacturers of Germany
Auto parts suppliers of Germany
Battery electric vehicle manufacturers
Companies based in Bavaria
Vehicle manufacturing companies established in 1939
German brands
Sports car manufacturers
Electric vehicle manufacturers of Germany
German companies established in 1939
Auto tuning companies